Willebroek (old spelling: Willebroeck) is a municipality located in the Belgian province of Antwerp. In 2021, Willebroek had a total population of 27,081. The total area is 27.41 km².

Willebroek is linked to Brussels by the Willebroek Canal.

Willebroek is also home to the Kanaalfeesten, a yearly festival that takes place throughout the town which includes live concerts (mostly of local bands) and general festival attractions, like a mini roller coaster, a duck shoot, etc. At Klein-Willebroek the Harmonium Art museuM on pump organs is established in the former Church of the Immaculate Conception.

The city is subject of the song De Brug van Willebroek by Wannes Van de Velde.

See also
 Fort Breendonk

References

External links

Official website - Available only in Dutch
Local history & dialect website - Available only in Dutch

Municipalities of Antwerp Province
Populated places in Antwerp Province